Sarah Beth James, (born October 21, 1989) is an American beauty pageant titleholder from Madison, Mississippi who was named Miss Mississippi 2010.

Biography
She won the title of Miss Mississippi on July 10, 2010, when she received her crown from outgoing titleholder Anna Tadlock. Her platform is the promotion of organ and tissue donation, and her competition talent is piano. At the time of her crowning, James was a junior majoring in communications at Mississippi State University.

References

External links
 

1989 births
Living people
People from Madison, Mississippi
Miss America 2011 delegates
Mississippi State University alumni
American beauty pageant winners
Miss Mississippi winners